McFarland, is a variation of MacFarlane that became popular in northern Ireland, but can be found worldwide. The home of the MacFarlane clan is the parish of Arrochar at the head of Loch Lomond and Loch Long at the beginning of the western Highlands in Scotland. This area was granted by feudal charter to one of the younger sons of the second earl of Lennox in 1286.  The history of this exchange is found in an old Celtic genealogy of Duncan, the eighth Earl of Lennox, who was executed in 1425. According to genealogical accounts, the first Earl of Lennox was Alwyn, followed by his son, also named Alwyn, in 1199 as the second Earl. This Alwyn had many sons, the eldest being Maldouen, the third Earl, who granted his younger brother, Gilchrist, the lands of Arrochar. Gilchrist's son Malduin was father to Parlan.  In 1344, Parlan's son, Malcolm MacPharlain, renewed the charter for the lands of Arrochar from Donald, the 6th Earl of Lennox.  The spelling changed over many years and times. The earliest MacFarlanes in northern Ireland appeared in documents as "mcffarlan" but eventually McFarland became a dominant spelling there, and as men moved back and forth between Ireland and Scotland, the use of the "d" appeared in Scotland as well. In early America the spelling could be McFarlin, MacFarland, McFarlan, or McFarling.

Alan McFarland (born 1949), Northern Ireland Ulster Unionist Party politician and MLA for North Down
Alexander McFarland (1812–1881), Michigan politician
Anne Hazen McFarland (1868–?), American physician, medical journal editor
Anthony "Booger" McFarland (born 1977), American professional football player
Anthony McFarland Jr. (born 1999), American football player
Arthur McFarland (1874–1959), American athlete and coach
Barrelhouse Buck McFarland (1903–1962), American blues and boogie-woogie pianist
Billy McFarland, Northern Irish loyalist paramilitary, leading figure in the Ulster Defence Association
Billy McFarland (fraudster) (born 1991), American tech entrepreneur
Doug McFarland (born 1946), American Politician/Hamline Professor; Minnesota
Dylan McFarland (born 1980), American professional football player
Ernest McFarland (1894–1984), American politician; U.S. Senator and Governor of Arizona
Frank Mace MacFarland (1869–1951), American malacologist
Gary McFarland (1933–1971), American musician, composer and arranger
George B. McFarland (1866–1942), Thai physician
George McFarland (1928–1993), American actor and singer who played "Spanky" in the Our Gang series
Graeme McFarland (born 1983), American Football Player, Indiana University
Jack McFarland (born 1969), American politician
James T. McFarland (1930-2015), New York politician
Jim McFarland (1947-2020), American football player, politician, and lawyer
John McFarland (disambiguation), several people
Kathleen Troia McFarland (born 1951), American politician; Assistant Secretary of Defense 1982–1985, Deputy National Security Advisor of Donald Trump
Matthew W. McFarland, American judge
Mark McFarland (born 1978), American NASCAR race driver
Michael C. McFarland (born 1948), American academic; president of the College of the Holy Cross in Worcester, Massachusetts
Mike McFarland (born 1970), American actor, comedian, director, and writer
Packey McFarland (1888–1936), American boxer
Patrick McFarland (born 1951), American professional basketball player
Roy McFarland (born 1948), English professional football manager
Rebecca McFarland, American actress
T. J. McFarland (Timothy J. McFarland, born 1989), American baseball pitcher
Virgie McFarland (1877 - 1971), Scottish educator and writer
William McFarland (disambiguation), several people

Fictional characters
Ambrose McFarland, fictional head of the coal company from the 2000 drama film Songcatcher, played by Steve Boles
Clementine McFarland, fictional wife of the head of the coal company from the 2000 drama film Songcatcher, played by Rhoda Griffis
Jack McFarland, fictional character from the sitcom Will & Grace
Mrs. McFarland, fictional character from the 1989 Christmas film Prancer, played by Cloris Leachman

References

Anglicised Scottish Gaelic-language surnames